S. M. Balaji is a Dental, Oral, and Maxillofacial Surgeon from Chennai, Tamil Nadu, India.  He is a dental scientist who specializes in repair of cleft palate, rhinoplasty, ear reconstruction, jaw reconstruction, facial asymmetry correction, dental implantology, maxillofacial surgery and Craniofacial surgery.He is the alumni of prestigious Annamalai University where so many efficient oral and Maxillofacial surgeons are trained.

Balaji conducts medical camps in South India, North America, China, Russia, Andamans and Maldives with the support of the governments as the majority of the people cannot afford these surgeries.

Balaji does craniofacial, maxillofacial, cleft lip and palate surgery at Victoria Hospital, Mahe – Seychelles, Jawaharlal Nehru Hospital  and Vacua Hospital, Mauritius, Indra Gandhi Hospital, Republic of Maldives. Formerly Consultant Maxillofacial Surgeon at Apollo Hospital, Colombo, Sri Lanka.He is also a Cleft Craniofacial Surgeon at G.P Pant Hospital, Andaman Nicobar Islands.

A documentary on Balaji's surgical expertise and success in skull and face reconstruction surgery was telecast at International Film Festival, Berlin in 1996. The documentary portrays how children with craniofacial deformities from various parts of the world were surgically treated and rehabilitated by him. It showcased how drastically the life of child with facial deformity blooms with happiness, how misery and self-pity turns to a normal and healthy life. The documentary was directed by Dr. Gloriana, International Co-ordinator and Jury for the International Film Festivals.

Balaji has published papers in International Journal of Oral and Maxillofacial Surgery, Implant Dentistry, Journal of Maxillofacial and Oral Surgery, Scandinavian Journal of Plastic and Reconstructive Surgery and Hand Surgery and Indian Journal of Oral and Maxillofacial Surgery. He organised the Indian dental conference in Chennai and was the organising chairman of the conference. He was the first Indian to be the President of the 7th World Cleft Lip & Palate Congress held at Republic of Seychelles.

Balaji is the author of The Textbook on Oral and Maxillofacial Surgery. The second edition of this book has the foreword written by Daniel M Laskin who is regarded as the pioneer Oral and Maxillofacial Surgeon.

Balaji documented his surgical life in the form of Textbook “Clinical Cranio-Maxillofacial Surgery”. The textbook is aimed at young surgeons and trainee surgeons and teaches them to solve the challenges posed by complex craniofacial situations.

He was the Chairman of the 4th World Congress on Craniofacial Tissue Engineering, the Joint meet of both the European & Asia-Pacific Conferences, that was held in Male, Republic of Maldives. Previously these conferences used to be held in Paris and London.

Balaji was conferred with Doctor of Science (Honoris Causa) by Dr D Y Patil University, Mumbai, for his contribution to dentistry and craniofacially deformed children.

Career
He stated, "As a senior resident, I tried applying gutka and betel nut to the lips of rabbits and observing them. After about three months, I noticed changes in the tissues."

Now his research leans towards surgical techniques. He has researched and presented papers on surgical techniques for deformed noses (rhinoplasty), facial paralysis and lesions that may lead to oral cancer, TM Joint Ankylosis and other topics."

Since 2010 he has been the Editor-in-Chief of the Annals of Maxillofacial Surgery  and the Executive Editor of Indian Journal of Dental Research.

Awards
In 2002 he received the Tamil Nadu Scientist Award from the department of Science and Technology, Government of Tamil Nadu.

Balaji received in 2008 from the Indian President Pratibha Patil, the B. C. Roy Award which is presented for Medicine to eminent doctors for their contribution to medical research, teaching and development of specialities in various branches of medicine.

Indian Government awarded twice Best Medical Book Award with 10000 INR cash prize in year 2001 & 2003.

He has been awarded the Brammaiah Sastri Award for ground breaking research findings in the field of reconstructive surgery using novel bone morphogenetic proteins by the Indian Association of Bio-medical Scientist conference at Chandigarh.

He was awarded the "Dr. Ginwallah Rolling Trophy" of the Association of Oral and Maxillofacial Surgeons of India twice for scientific research in maxillofacial surgery. He has won the "Modus Award of Merit" for presenting the 'Best Innovative Surgical Technique' at the 6th Asian Conference on Oral and Maxillofacial Surgery held at Tokyo.

Balaji was honored with Prof. David Precious Scientific Award at the 2018 Leipzig in the XII International Cleft Lip and Palate Conference. His research on guided bone regeneration in cleft deformities was selected for this award. He is the first and only Indian to receive this award.

References

External links
 Balaji Dental and Craniofacial Hospital

People from Kanyakumari district
Indian dentists
People from Tamil Nadu
Living people
Year of birth missing (living people)
Missing middle or first names
Dr. B. C. Roy Award winners